"The Wild Boys" is the twelfth single by English new wave band Duran Duran, released on 26 October 1984 in the United Kingdom.

The song was the only studio track on the band's live album Arena (1984), and was produced by Nile Rodgers, who had previously remixed the band's previous single "The Reflex". It was recorded at the end of July 1984 at Maison Rouge Studios in London.

Background
The idea for the song came from longtime Duran Duran video director Russell Mulcahy, who wanted to make a full-length feature film based on the surreal and sexual 1971 novel The Wild Boys: A Book of the Dead by William S. Burroughs. He suggested that the band might create a modern soundtrack for the film in the same way that Queen would later provide a rock soundtrack for Mulcahy's 1986 film Highlander. Lead vocalist Simon Le Bon began writing some lyrics based on Mulcahy's quick synopsis of the book, and the band created a harsh-sounding instrumental backdrop for them.

The single was issued with six separate collectible covers – one featuring each individual band member and one of the band collectively.

Critical reception
Cash Box called the song "a rolling pop tune with a tribal intensity."  Billboard suggested that it sounds like "'Reflex' revisited."

Chart performances
"The Wild Boys" became one of the band's highest-charting singles, peaking at number two on the US Billboard Hot 100 for four weeks, behind "Out of Touch" by Hall & Oates and "Like a Virgin" by Madonna, while reaching the top spot on the US Cash Box Top Singles chart and in Germany and South Africa. It peaked at number two on the UK Singles Chart and on the Irish Singles Chart, as well as in several European countries. It also became the band's highest-peaking single in Australia, reaching number three. As of October 2021, "The Wild Boys" is the 10th-most streamed Duran Duran song in the UK.

Music video

The music video for "The Wild Boys" was directed by Russell Mulcahy. The cost totalled over one million pounds, a staggering sum for music videos at the time, as his design filled one entire end of the "007 Stage" at Pinewood Studios with a metal pyramid and a windmill over a deep enclosed pool, and called for a lifelike robotic face, dozens of elaborate costumes, prosthetics, and make-up effects, and then-cutting-edge computer graphics. The choreography of dance routines was undertaken by Arlene Phillips, including intricate stunts and fire effects added to the cost. Mulcahy meant the video to be a teaser for his full-length Burroughs film, demonstrating his vision to the movie studios he was wooing, but that project was never made.

The video featured all of the band members imprisoned and in peril, wearing uncharacteristically rough and ragged outfits similar to the pieced-together clothing of the film Mad Max 2 (1981). John Taylor was strapped to the roof of a car suffering a psycho-torture with pictures of his childhood and early past; Nick Rhodes was caged with a pile of computer equipment; Roger Taylor was put in a hot-air balloon that was dangling from the ceiling, leaving him high off the ground; Andy Taylor was bound (guitar and all) to a ship's figurehead; and Simon Le Bon was strapped to a blade of the windmill, his head covered in water as the blade passed through the pool.

"The Wild Boys" was named British Video of the Year at the 1985 Brit Awards.

Remixes and B-sides
The 8:00 12" "Wilder Than Wild Boys" extended mix, the only official contemporaneous remix, is actually the full length version. It continues after the album/single version's fade out with another instrumental section, then repeats the chorus to fade. This mix was also used for the full length promo video.

To promote the release of the compilation album Greatest in 1998, EMI commissioned a number of remixes, including two mixes of "The Wild Boys" that were released only on promo discs:

 "The Wild Boys [ASAP & PM Project Remix]" (3:42) appeared on a one-track promo CD in Spain
 "Wild Boys 98 [4 on da Floor Remix]" (3:10) appeared on a one-track promo CD in Belgium

In 2004, noted remixer Paul Dakeyne and the Mitchell Project produced the 7:30 "Wicked 'n Wild Dub" for DMC, the UK-based remix service.

The original single B-side, "(I'm Looking For) Cracks in the Pavement (Live)", was recorded at the 5 March 1984 show at Maple Leaf Gardens in Toronto. This is the same concert where the video for "The Reflex" was filmed.

Formats and track listing

7": Parlophone. / Duran 3 UK
 "The Wild Boys (45)" – 4:14
 "(I'm Looking For) Cracks in the Pavement" (1984) – 4:00
 Track 2 recorded live at Maple Leaf Gardens, Toronto, 5 March 1984.
 Also released in sleeves featuring individual band members (DURANC 3)

12": Parlophone. / 12 Duran 3 UK
 "The Wild Boys" (Wilder Than the Wild Boys) (Extended Mix) – 8:00
 "The Wild Boys (45)" – 4:16
 "(I'm Looking For) Cracks in the Pavement" (1984) – 4:08
 Track 3 recorded live at Maple Leaf Gardens, Toronto, 5 March 1984.

7": Capitol Records. / B-5417 US
 "The Wild Boys (45)" – 4:14
 "(I'm Looking For) Cracks in the Pavement" (1984) – 4:00
 Track 2 recorded live at Maple Leaf Gardens, Toronto, 5 March 1984.

12": Capitol Records. / V-6817 US
 "The Wild Boys" (Wilder Than the Wild Boys) (Extended Mix) – 8:00
 "The Wild Boys (45)" – 4:16
 "(I'm Looking For) Cracks in the Pavement" (1984) – 4:08
 Track 3 recorded live at Maple Leaf Gardens, Toronto, 5 March 1984.

CD: Part of Singles Box Set 1981–1985 boxset
 "The Wild Boys (45)" – 4:16
 "(I'm Looking For) Cracks in the Pavement" (1984) – 4:08
 "The Wild Boys" (Wilder Than the Wild Boys) (Extended Mix) – 8:00
 Track 2 recorded live at Maple Leaf Gardens, Toronto, 5 March 1984.

Charts

Weekly charts

Year-end charts

Certifications

Other appearances
Apart from the single, "The Wild Boys" has also appeared on:

Albums:
Arena (1984)
Decade: Greatest Hits (1989)
Night Versions: The Essential Duran Duran (US only, 1998)
Greatest (1998)
Strange Behaviour (1999)

Phixx version

English-Irish boy band Phixx released their version in 2004 which peaked at No. 12 on the UK Singles Chart.

See also
List of number-one hits of 1984 (Germany)
List of number-one hits of 1985 (Italy)
List of Cash Box Top 100 number-one singles of 1984

References

External links
 

1984 songs
1984 singles
2004 singles
Capitol Records singles
Cashbox number-one singles
Concept Music singles
Dance-rock songs
Duran Duran songs
EMI Records singles
Music videos directed by Russell Mulcahy
Number-one singles in Germany
Number-one singles in South Africa
Phixx songs
Song recordings produced by Nile Rodgers
Songs written by Andy Taylor (guitarist)
Songs written by John Taylor (bass guitarist)
Songs written by Nick Rhodes
Songs written by Roger Taylor (Duran Duran drummer)
Songs written by Simon Le Bon